Agnes Chan Tsz-ching (born 14 March 1996) is a Hong Kong rugby union player. She was selected for Hong Kong's squad to the 2017 Women's Rugby World Cup in Ireland.

Biography 
In 2018, Chan made her Hong Kong Women's Sevens debut. It was a qualifier for the 2018–19 Women's Sevens Series. She also featured at the 2019 Hong Kong Women's Sevens as Hong Kong tried to qualify for the 2019–20 Women's Sevens Series. She was named in Hong Kong's sevens squad to the 2021 Asia Women's Sevens Series which acted as a qualifier for the 2022 Sevens World Cup and a seeding event for the 2022 Asian Games. Unfortunately Hong Kong won bronze and did not qualify.

Chan was named in the squad that played in a two-test series against Kazakhstan in December 2022.

References 

1996 births
Living people
Hong Kong people
Hong Kong rugby union players
Hong Kong female rugby union players
Hong Kong female rugby sevens players
Rugby union players at the 2018 Asian Games